Stephen or Steven Morris may refer to:

Sportspeople
Stephen Morris (American football) (born 1992), American football player
Stephen Morris (runner) (born 1988), British Paralympic athlete 
Stephen Morris (footballer) (born 1976), English footballer
Steven Morris (Australian footballer) (born 1988), Australian rules footballer
Steven Morris (footballer, born 1986), U.S.-born Honduran soccer player

Others
Stephen Morris (politician) (born 1946), member of the Kansas Senate
Stephen Morris (musician) (born 1957), rock musician in the bands Joy Division, New Order, The Other Two and Bad Lieutenant
Stephen Morris (theologian), Eastern Orthodox priest and writer
Stephen Morris (economist), game theorist at MIT, president of the Econometric Society, and former editor of Econometrica
Stephen Morris (novel), a 1961 novel by Nevile Shute

See also
Stephon Morris (born 1991), American football cornerback

Morris, Stephen